Bimeh Metro Station is a station in Tehran Metro Line 4. It is located on Lashgari Expressway next to Shahrak-e Bimeh. It is between Meydan-e Azadi Metro Station and Shahrak-e Ekbatan Metro Station. It is also the terminus of the Mehrabad Airport branch of the line, having a special distinct fleet of trains running along it.

References

Tehran Metro stations
Railway stations opened in 2016